Jeff "Salzy" Salzenstein (born October 14, 1973) is an American left-handed former professional tennis player. In 1986 he won the US Boys' 12 National Hard Court Tennis Singles Championship and Doubles Championship. His highest singles ranking was world No. 100 in June 2004, when he became the oldest American to break into the top 100 in men's tennis,  at 30 years of age. His career-high in doubles was No. 68 in November 1997.

Early life
Salzenstein is Jewish, was born in Peoria, Illinois, and lived in Englewood, Colorado. His father was a tennis coach, and his parents divorced when he was five years old.

Tennis career

Early career
As a sixth-grader, in addition to playing tennis the 12-year-old, five-foot tall, 85 pound  Salzenstein was an A student, the president of his sixth-grade class, the editor of its newspaper, and a basketball and soccer player. In 1986 he won the US Boys' 12 National Hard Court Tennis Singles Championship (defeating Brian Dunn and Vince Spadea along the way) and Doubles Championship. He was the 13th double winner in the tournament’s 25-year history, and was also awarded the tournament’s sportsmanship award. That year he also made it to the final, where he lost in a final set tiebreaker, in the 12-and-under National Clay Courts Championship. 

In 1990 Salzenstein reached the quarter finals at the Under-16 Championships, and in 1992 he was ranked second in Under-18 boys in the United States. 

He attended Cherry Creek High School (class of 1992) in Greenwood Village, Colorado. As a freshman, Salzenstein played for the No. 1 singles Colorado state title, and as a sophomore he won the title. As a junior, he was 5' 7" tall and weighed 120 pounds, was the team's # 1 singles player, and was runner-up in the state singles championship. He won the singles state title as a senior, and was captain of the school tennis team. In his high school career, his record was 74-6.

College
Salzenstein attended Stanford University on a half-scholarship, earned an economics degree, played #1 singles his sophomore, junior, and senior years for the Stanford Cardinal, and was named an All-American in tennis two years in a row. He reached the semifinals at the NCAA singles championships in 1995.  He won back-to-back team national titles with the team when he was its captain in 1995 and 1996. He was PAC-10 All-Academic in 1994 (second team), and 1995 and 1996 (first team). He was named the Senior Athlete of the Year at Stanford in 1996.

Pro career
His first USTA win was in 1996, winning doubles titles with partner Justin Gimelstob. In 1996, Salzenstein won 23 matches in a row.

At the 1997 US Open, he beat Mikael Tillström in the first round in four sets. At the Roland Garros doubles event, Salzenstein and partner Petr Korda made the round of 16. That year he earned Rookie of the Year honors from Tennis Week. 

Salzenstein was injured for much of 1998 and 1999, and had surgeries before he was 24 years old on his knee and ankle. He finished his degree at Stanford at this time.

In May 2000, Salzenstein won the Tallahassee Challenger, beating Kevin Kim 6–3, 6–2. In November, he won the Urbana, Illinois Challenger, defeating Antony Dupuis 7–6 (4), 6–4 in the final. In 2001, he won the $50,000 Seascape Challenger at Aptos, California. He won at Aptos in 2003 and at León, Mexico in 2004.

Salzenstein played at the Australian Open, Roland Garros, and Wimbledon in 2004, and at the International Series Tournament at Delray Beach, where he made it to the semifinals. In November 2004, he upset world No. 24 Jiří Novák) in straight sets in Luxembourg. In 2004 he became the oldest American to break into the top 100 in men's tennis, when Salzenstein did it at 30 years of age.

At 33 years of age, Salzenstein stopped competing in tennis, and moved into coaching.

Honors
In 2001, Salzenstein was inducted into the Colorado Tennis Hall Of Fame.

Post-playing career
Salzenstein is a certified nutritional therapist. He is also the founder of JS Performance Tennis School in Denver, Colorado, the CEO of Tennis Evolution, and runs a YouTube tennis coaching channel that goes by the same name.  Among others, he has coached Vasilisa Bardina.

ATP career finals

Doubles: 1 (1 runner-up)

ATP Challenger and ITF Futures finals

Singles: 8 (5–3)

Doubles: 9 (6–3)

Performance timeline

Singles

See also

List of select Jewish tennis players

References

External links
 
 
 Jews in Sports bio
 "Salzenstein enjoying his current elevator ride in pro tennis," 7/25/01
 "Jeff Salzenstein: Circuit Player of the Week," 7/22/03
 Jeff Salzenstein's website: Online Tennis Training and Coaching Videos | Tennis Evolution
 Jeff Salzenstein's YouTube channel: Tennis Evolution - Online Tennis Lessons - YouTube
 Jeff Salzenstein's executive coaching website: 

1973 births
American male tennis players
Jewish tennis players
Jewish American sportspeople
Living people
People from Arapahoe County, Colorado
Sportspeople from Peoria, Illinois
Stanford Cardinal men's tennis players
Tennis people from Colorado
Tennis people from Illinois